Ratko Štritof (born 14 January 1972) is a water polo player from Croatia, who was a member of the national team that won the silver medal at the 1996 Summer Olympics in Atlanta, Georgia. He was born in Rijeka. He coaches HAVK Mladost youth team lately.

See also
 List of Olympic medalists in water polo (men)

References

 Štritof - coach in HAVK Mladost, Zagreb

External links
 

1972 births
Living people
Sportspeople from Rijeka
Croatian male water polo players
Olympic silver medalists for Croatia in water polo
Water polo players at the 1996 Summer Olympics
Water polo players at the 2000 Summer Olympics
Water polo players at the 2004 Summer Olympics
Medalists at the 1996 Summer Olympics
Croatian water polo coaches
Croatian expatriate sportspeople in Italy
Expatriate water polo players